Silvia Persi (born 13 October 1965) is an Italian former swimmer who competed in the 1984 Summer Olympics and in the 1988 Summer Olympics.

References

1965 births
Living people
Swimmers from Rome
Italian female swimmers
Italian female freestyle swimmers
Olympic swimmers of Italy
Swimmers at the 1984 Summer Olympics
Swimmers at the 1988 Summer Olympics
European Aquatics Championships medalists in swimming
Mediterranean Games gold medalists for Italy
Mediterranean Games silver medalists for Italy
Swimmers at the 1987 Mediterranean Games
Universiade medalists in swimming
Mediterranean Games medalists in swimming
Universiade bronze medalists for Italy
Medalists at the 1987 Summer Universiade
20th-century Italian women